Albert "Tootie" Heath (born May 31, 1935) is an American jazz hard bop drummer, the brother of tenor saxophonist Jimmy Heath and the double-bassist Percy Heath.

Born in Philadelphia, Pennsylvania, United States, he first recorded in 1957 with John Coltrane. From 1958 to 1974, he worked with, among others, J. J. Johnson, Wes Montgomery, Art Farmer and Benny Golson's Jazztet, Cedar Walton, Bobby Timmons, Kenny Drew, Sonny Rollins, Dexter Gordon, Johnny Griffin, Herbie Hancock, Friedrich Gulda, Nina Simone, and Yusef Lateef. In 1975, he, Jimmy and Percy formed the Heath Brothers.  He remained with the group until 1978, then left to freelance. He has recorded extensively throughout his career.

Among his many workshop and classroom teaching assignments, Heath is a regular instructor at the Stanford Jazz Workshop.

Tootie Heath is now the producer and leader of The Whole Drum Truth, a jazz drum ensemble featuring Ben Riley, Ed Thigpen, Jackie Williams, Billy Hart, Charlie Persip, Leroy Williams and Louis Hayes.

Discography

As leader
1969: Kawaida (O'Be, 1969) with Ed Blackwell, Herbie Hancock, Buster Williams, James Mtume
1974: Kwanza (The First) (Muse)
2009: Live at Smalls (Smalls Live) 
2012: Krakkle (Geco)
2013: Tootie's Tempo (Sunnyside) 
2014: Philadelphia Beat (Sunnyside)

As sideman
With Kenny Barron
Peruvian Blue (Muse, 1974)
With Walter Benton
Out of This World (Jazzland, 1960)
With Anthony Braxton
In the Tradition (SteepleChase, 1974)
In the Tradition Volume 2 (SteepleChase, 1974 [1977])
With George Cables
Skylark (SteepleChase, 1995)
With the Kenny Clarke/Francy Boland Big Band
Latin Kaleidoscope (MPS, 1968)
With John Coltrane
Coltrane (Prestige, 1957)
Lush Life (Prestige, 1956-58 [1961])
With Ted Curson
Quicksand (Atlantic, 1974)
With Kenny Dorham
Trompeta Toccata (Blue Note, 1964)
With Kenny Drew
Dark Beauty (Steeplechase, 1974)
If You Could See Me Now (Steeplechase, 1974)
With Art Farmer
Big City Sounds (Argo, 1960) – with Benny Golson
Art (Argo, 1960)
The Jazztet and John Lewis (Argo, 1961) – with Benny Golson
The Jazztet at Birdhouse (Argo, 1961) – with Benny Golson
New York Jazz Sextet: Group Therapy (Scepter, 1966)
Voices All (Eastworld, 1982) – with Benny Golson
Moment to Moment (Soul Note, 1983) – with Benny Golson
Central Avenue Reunion (Contemporary, 1989)
With Benny Golson
Take a Number from 1 to 10 (Argo, 1961)
The Roland Kirk Quartet Meets the Benny Golson Orchestra (Mercury, 1964)
With Dexter Gordon
Both Sides of Midnight (Black Lion, 1967 [1981])
Body and Soul (Black Lion, 1967 [1981]) 
Take the "A" Train (Black Lion, 1967 [1988]) 
The Tower of Power! (Prestige, 1969)
More Power! (Prestige, 1969)
The Apartment (SteepleChase, 1975)
With Bennie Green and Gene Ammons
The Swingin'est (Vee-Jay, 1958)
With Johnny Griffin
Bush Dance (Galaxy, 1978)
With Herbie Hancock
The Prisoner (Blue Note, 1969)
With Jimmy Heath
The Thumper (Riverside, 1959)
Really Big! (Riverside, 1960)
The Quota (Riverside, 1961)
Triple Threat (Riverside, 1962)
Swamp Seed (Riverside, 1963)
On the Trail (Riverside, 1964)
The Gap Sealer (Cobblestone, 1973)
You've Changed (SteepleChase, 1991)
You or Me (SteepleChase, 1995)
With Milt Jackson
Milt Jackson Quintet Live at the Village Gate (Riverside, 1963)
Much in Common with Ray Brown (Verve, 1964)
With J. J. Johnson
J. J. in Person! (Columbia, 1958)
Really Livin' (Columbia, 1959)
J.J. Inc. (Columbia, 1961)
With Clifford Jordan
Spellbound (Riverside, 1960)
Starting Time (Jazzland, 1961)
These are My Roots: Clifford Jordan Plays Leadbelly (Atlantic, 1965)
In the World (Strata-East, 1969 [1972])
Half Note (SteepleChase, 1974 [1985])
With Yusef Lateef
Yusef Lateef's Detroit (Atlantic, 1969)
Suite 16 (Atlantic, 1970)
The Gentle Giant (Atlantic, 1971)
Hush 'N' Thunder (Atlantic, 1972)
Part of the Search (Atlantic, 1973)
10 Years Hence (Atlantic, 1974)
With Johnny Lytle
Blue Vibes (Jazzland, 1960)
With Roberto Magris
 Morgan Rewind: A Tribute to Lee Morgan Vol. 1 (JMood, 2012)
 One Night in with Hope and More Vol. 1 (JMood, 2012)
 One Night in with Hope and More Vol. 2 (JMood, 2013)
With Guido Manusardi
Trio de Jazz (Electrecord – EDE 0476, 1968)
With Warne Marsh
Back Home (Criss Cross, 1986)
With Ronnie Mathews
Doin' the Thang! (Prestige, 1963)
With Charles McPherson
Bebop Revisited! (Prestige, 1964)
With Blue Mitchell
A Sure Thing (Riverside, 1962)
Mapenzi with Harold Land (Concord, 1977)
With Roscoe Mitchell
Hey Donald (Delmark, 1995)
In Walked Buckner (Delmark, 1999)
With Wes Montgomery
The Incredible Jazz Guitar of Wes Montgomery (Riverside, 1960)
With Tete Montoliu
Piano for Nuria (SABA, 1968)
Catalonian Fire (SteepleChase, 1974)
Tete! (SteepleChase, 1975)
Tête à Tete (SteepleChase, 1976)
Tootie's Tempo (SteepleChase, 1976 [1979])
Catalonian Nights Vol. 1 (Steeplechase, 1980 [1981])
Catalonian Nights Vol. 2 (Steeplechase, 1980 [1985])
Catalonian Nights Vol. 3 (Steeplechase, 1980 [1989])
With Don Patterson
These Are Soulful Days (Muse, 1973)
With Cecil Payne
Zodiac (Strata-East, 1968 [1973])
With Niels-Henning Ørsted Pedersen
Double Bass (SteepleChase, 1976) with Sam Jones
With Sonny Red
Breezing (Jazzland, 1960)
With George Russell
George Russell Sextet at Beethoven Hall (MPS, 1965)
With Michel Sardaby
Night Blossom (DIW, 1990)
With Bud Shank
That Old Feeling (Contemporary, 1986)
With Nina Simone
Little Girl Blue (Bethlehem, 1958)
Nina Simone and Her Friends (Bethlehem, 1959)
With Les Spann
Gemini (Jazzland, 1961)
With Billy Taylor
Billy Taylor with Four Flutes (Riverside, 1959)
With Bobby Timmons
Chun-King (Prestige, 1964)
With Mal Waldron
Impressions (New Jazz, 1959)
With Cedar Walton
Soul Cycle (Prestige, 1969)
With The Young Lions
The Young Lions (Vee-Jay, 1960)

Awards and nominations
In October 2020, the National Endowment for the Arts (NEA) announced Heath as one of four recipients of the NEA Jazz Masters Fellowships, celebrated in an online concert and show on 22 April 2021. Awarded in recognition of lifetime achievement, the honor is bestowed on individuals who have made significant contributions to the art form. The other 2021 recipients were Terri Lyne Carrington, Phil Schaap, and Henry Threadgill.

References

External links
 "Albert 'Tootie' Heath" biography and management, Soul Patch Music. 
 Brotherly Jazz. The Heath Brothers DVD Documentary.
 Tootie Heath's MySpace page
 Ben Ratliff, "Music in Review; Heath Brothers", The New York Times, April 4, 2003.
 "Interview with Albert 'Tootie' Heath", DTM.
 "Albert 'Tootie' Heath, Drummer Extraordinaire, Turns The Tables", interview on All Things Considered, NPR, March 14, 2015.
 Albert Heath at Tower Records.

1935 births
Living people
Hard bop drummers
Post-bop drummers
American jazz drummers
African-American drummers
Jazz musicians from Pennsylvania
Muse Records artists
20th-century American drummers
American male drummers
20th-century American male musicians
American male jazz musicians
Modern Jazz Quartet members
Heath Brothers members
The Jazztet members
Sunnyside Records artists
20th-century African-American musicians
21st-century African-American people
Spiritual jazz musicians